Cyril Chevreuil (born 13 January 1990) is a French professional footballer who plays as a forward for Régional 1 club Carnoux FC. Besides France, he has played in the Netherlands.

Career
Chevreuil started his career with Marseille Endoume, before signing terms with AS Gémenos. In the summer of 2015 he moved to Aubagne for a few months, before choosing to return to Gémenos.

He joined Dutch side Sparta Rotterdam in August 2016. On 22 October 2016, he made his Sparta Rotterdam debut in a 1–0 away defeat against PSV, replacing Michel Breuer in the 84th minute. His contract was terminated on 16 March 2017.

In June 2017, Chevreuil joined AS Gémenos for a third time.

References

External links
 
 

1990 births
Living people
Footballers from Marseille
French footballers
Association football forwards
Sparta Rotterdam players
Hyères FC players
Eredivisie players
Aubagne FC players
Championnat National 3 players
Tweede Divisie players
Championnat National 2 players
Régional 1 players
French expatriate footballers
Expatriate footballers in the Netherlands
French expatriate sportspeople in the Netherlands